Jack Donaldson (25 April 1880 – 25 October 1934) was an Australian rules footballer who played with Melbourne in the Victorian Football League (VFL).

Notes

External links 

1880 births
Australian rules footballers from Ballarat
Melbourne Football Club players
1934 deaths